Gadariya or  Gadaria (also known as, Pal, Nikhar, Baghel, Kuruba, Kurumba/Kurumbar, Kuruma, Gadri, Gayri , Bhedihar, Dhangar, Bharwad, veer_gadariya etc.) are a community of traditionally non-elite Shepherd in India, They were traditionally involved professionally in livestock breeding, especially sheep. They are primarily found in Uttar Pradesh, Karnataka, Goa, Maharashtra, Andhra Pradesh, Telanga and in some parts of Punjab, haryana, Jharkhand, Rajasthan, Himachal Pradesh, Madhya Pradesh and Bihar. In Gujarat, they are called Bharwad.

Etymology
The word Gadaria is derived from the old Hindi word Gadar, which means sheep.

First:-

The word Gadaria is made up of two Sanskrit words, Garh + Arya i.e. Gadharya / Gadaria, hence the women of the Gadaria caste are called Garh + Rani i.e. Gadarani / Gadarni.

Here the citadel can have different meanings like:-

1.  Garh also means fort and Arya means husband or lord, thus he became Garhpati or lord of forts/forts.

2.  The meaning of Garh is to live in a stronghold or to live in a group, that is, to stay together or united (like the description of many tribes in the Vedas who used to live together in a group) means to be the master of the group or tribe.

Second:-

The word Gadaria is the tadbhav form of the Sanskrit language Gaddalika, which means the person who walks at the forefront of the herd of sheep, i.e. Gadaria or the queen sheep walking at the front.

History
The Gadarias are of [OBC] origin.

In the early 1910s, an educated class of Gadarias formed All India Pal Kshatriya Mahasabha. There were debates within the community whether to add Kshatriya suffix to the community name. In the 1930s, they started referring to themselves as "Pali Rajput", a synonym of Pal kshatriya. They started caste magazines like "Pal kshatriya Samachar" and "Shepherd Times". Later the community went through the process of de-sanskritization and dropped the suffix Kshatriya. Among the reasons cited for de-sanskritization were losing autonomy of their caste identity and avoiding being submerged into the identity of high castes.

ShivajiRao

Sub-castes and clans
There are two major subdivisions amongst Gadarias, namely Dhengar and Nikhar.Third is Gangajali. They share the same gotras.Bamaniya, Ahir, pachaury,Bais(Baniya), Bhindwar, Pindwar, Hindwar, Chauhan, Tawar Parihar, Sisodiya, Sikarwar, Chandel, Riyar, Rotella, Mohania, Maurya etc. are some of the gotras amongst them.Shashank Gaurav, Banmankhi.

Classification 
In Bihar, Uttar Pradesh, Uttarakhand, Maharashtra, Madhya Pradesh, Chhattisgarh, Rajasthan and Delhi they are classified as Other Backward Class, and in Haryana and Punjab, India they are classified as other backward class in the Indian System of Reservation.

Religion
They practice Hinduism, worship family deities and various other deities including Ram, Krishna, Shiva, Vishnu, Hanuman, Kali, Chandi and Lakshmi. Some of them wear sacred thread. Majority of them are vegetarians.

References

Bibliography
● https://en.m.wikipedia.org/wiki/Kurumba_(tribe)
 
 

Indian castes
Other Backward Classes of Chhattisgarh
Other Backward Classes of Gujarat
Other Backward Classes of Rajasthan
Other Backward Classes of Madhya Pradesh
Other Backward Classes of Uttar Pradesh
Other Backward Classes of Maharashtra
Other Backward Classes of Bihar
Scheduled Castes of Haryana
Pastoralists
Herding castes